Now That's What I Call the 1990s is a special edition compilation album from the (U.S.) Now! series released on November 9, 2010. It entered the Billboard 200 albums chart at No. 173 in the issue dated November 27, 2010.

Track listing

Reception

According to Andrew Leahey of Allmusic, Now That's What I Call the 1990s is a "narrow-minded compilation" with a mix of pop songs and alternative music which focuses on the second half of the decade and ignores "grunge, Euro-dance, and teen pop".

References

External links
 Official U.S. 'Now That's What I Call Music' website

2010 compilation albums
1990s